St Jude's Church, Courtfield Gardens, Kensington, London, was designed by architects George Godwin and Henry Godwin, and built between 1867 and 1870; the tower and spire were constructed in 1879. It was built on the northern portion of Captain Robert Gunter's estate. The project was overseen by Reverend J. A. Aston, and financed by John Derby Allcroft, a wealthy glove manufacturer. The construction, not including the tower, pulpit, font and organ cost £11,300, and was undertaken by Myers & Sons.

The building is now occupied by St Mellitus College, led by the Dean, Andy Emerton. The college runs ordination and theology courses. It is also occupied by a homeless charity, the Earl's Court Project. On Sundays the building is one of five sites where the church of Holy Trinity Brompton meets.

Original exterior

St Jude's Church is surrounded by Courtfield Gardens, Collingham Road, and Courtfield Road. Adjacent to the north is the Vicarage (built in 1874), also designed by George and Henry Godwin.

The building was realised in a Gothic Revival style. It was built of Kentish ragstone, with ashlar stone dressings and has steeply pitched gabled roofs, of more than forty roof slopes. The roof is slate, in varying coloured bands of pale and dark grey tiles.

Original interior

The nave has galleries at a first floor level, on the north, west and south sides. It is unusually wide for its length, and has banded iron columns with sheet copper crafted capitals. The brickwork contains elaborate patterns of buff, red and black bricks, and murals in roundels above the column capitals, and in the reveal of the chancel arch, painted by Edward Frampton. The nave has diagonally-set quarry tiles, and the chancel is Minton tiles.

The chancel has several interesting features: the reredos is alabaster, with mosaics by Antonio Salviati, and sculpted figures of St Jude, St Peter, and St Augustine. The pulpit is marble and alabaster, and the lectern is brass. These were designed by Thomas Earp and crafted by Edward Frampton.

Use of the building

The Reverend Robert William Forest D.D. was the first incumbent of the church, and later was Dean of Worcester. The building was designed for a capacity of up to 1600 during services by utilising the nave, narthex, and galleries.

The building was listed Grade II* on 7 November 1984.

In 2006, the parishioners of St Jude's Church were absorbed into St Mary the Boltons, doubling the latter's congregation. Meanwhile, the building was taken over by Holy Trinity Brompton Church (HTB).

Building project

Under the leadership of HTB, and designed by HMDW Architects, work began in 2010 to transform the building into a theological college – St Mellitus College. The roof was entirely replaced, with like-for-like slates. The newly excavated undercroft houses two lecture rooms, offices and amenities. On the ground floor, the nave has been renovated, and a café has been installed in the narthex. A new first floor, at the same level of the galleries, provides a library above the Narthex Café for students of the college. The western exterior entrance stonework has been cleaned, and the interior white paint, applied to cover the brickwork, has been removed. Archived memorials have been reinstated.

References

External links

 HTB's Official Site
 HMDW Architects website

19th-century Church of England church buildings
2006 disestablishments in England
Church of England church buildings in the Royal Borough of Kensington and Chelsea
Grade II listed churches in the Royal Borough of Kensington and Chelsea
Kensington
St Mellitus College